Sanjiv Chopra, M.B.B.S, M.A.C.P, is an Indian-born American physician, Professor of Medicine and former Faculty Dean for Continuing Medical Education (CME) at Harvard Medical School. He currently serves as a Marshall Wolf Master Clinician Educator at Brigham and Women's Hospital and co-director of the CME Division in the Department of Medicine at Beth Israel Deaconess Medical Center. He's a sought after inspirational speaker, addressing diverse audiences on topics in medicine as well as leadership, how to find your purpose, an invitation to good health and lasting happiness, etc. He has published ten books, including a national best-seller, Brotherhood: Dharma, Destiny, and the American Dream, co-authored with his brother, Deepak Chopra.

Early life
Born in Poona (noe, Pune), India, two years after India's independence from British rule, Chopra was inspired from a young age to follow in the footsteps of his father, Krishan Chopra (1919–2002) a renowned Indian cardiologist. Krishan Chopra was a Fellow of the Royal Hospital of Physicians and served as head of the Department of Medicine and Cardiology at Mool Chand Khairati Ram Hospital, New Delhi, for over 25 years. He retired as a lieutenant colonel from the Indian Army. Sanjiv Chopra's paternal grandfather was a sergeant in the British Army. Chopra's older brother, Deepak Chopra, is an author and alternative medicine advocate.

Family life
Chopra married Amita Rani Chopra at the age of 20. They were classmates at the All India Institute of Medical Sciences (AIIMS). Amita is a pediatrician who has recently retired and currently teaches meditation. They moved to the United States in 1972. They have three children and two granddaughters.

Education
Sanjiv Chopra graduated from St. Columba's School, Delhi in 1964. He did his premedical qualification from Hans Raj College, Delhi University.  He graduated from Medical School from the All India Institute of Medical Sciences (AIIMS). In 1972 he came to the United States for post-graduate training. After a year of Internship in Internal Medicine in New Jersey, he moved to Boston in 1973. Following his residency, he completed a fellowship in Gastroenterology and Hepatology, from 1975 - 1977. He has been on the faculty of Harvard Medical School since 1979.

Medical and academic career
Chopra was elected as a Master of the American College of Physicians in 2009, an award given to individuals for being "citizen physicians, educational innovators, scientific thinkers and humanists who inspire those around him or her and sets the standards for quality in medicine."

He is Professor of Medicine and, previously, Faculty Dean for Continuing Education at Harvard Medical School.
 
He has received a number of other awards, including the American Gastroenterological Association's Distinguished Educator Award. In 2012, he was awarded the Ellis Island Medal of Honor for "exemplifying outstanding qualities in both one's personal and professional lives while continuing to preserve the richness of one's particular heritage."
 
Chopra's book, Dr. Chopra Says: Medical Facts and Myths Everyone Should Know, co-authored with Alan Lotvin, was published in January 2011.
 
Chopra, while serving as the Faculty Dean for Continuing Education, led the most robust academic Continuing Medical Education enterprise in the world, reaching out to 80,000 clinicians in more than 160 countries each year. This included seven annual Current Clinical Issues in Primary Care (CCIPC) conferences held in collaboration with UCLA, Johns Hopkins, Baylor College of Medicine, University of Miami, Northwestern University and Columbia University College of Physicians and Surgeons.  In addition to directing these conferences, he delivered several lectures, moderated a number of sessions and has served as a keynote speaker on several occasions. Chopra is also editor-in-chief of the Hepatology section of UpToDate, an electronic textbook subscribed to by 1.5 million physicians in 195 countries.

Public speaking
Chopra has lectured on "Leadership for the 21st Century: The Tenets of Leadership" more than 150 times in the United States and more than 15 times in countries abroad.
 
In this presentation, he discusses a wide range of examples of leaders who have changed the world.  Chopra discusses historic figures such as Mahatma Gandhi, Florence Nightingale and Winston Churchill, as well as contemporary leaders, and examine what makes them effective. He has also given a keynote entitled The Two Most Important Days: How to Find Your Purpose and Live a Happier and Healthier Life innumerable times throughout the United States and abroad to great acclaim.

Awards
In 1985, he was selected for the George W. Thorn Award presented by the Brigham and Women's Hospital Housestaff, Harvard Medical School
In 1991, he received the highest accolade from the 1991 graduating class of Harvard Medical School, the Excellence in Teaching Award.
In 1995, Chopra was the recipient of the Robert S. Stone Award, an award that is chosen by colleagues, housestaff and students from the Beth Israel Deaconess Medical Center, Harvard Medical School, Boston, Massachusetts.
In 2003, he was the recipient of the American Gastroenterological Association's Distinguished Educator Award.
In 2009, Chopra was elected as a Master of the American College of Physicians
In 2012, he was the recipient of Ellis Island Medal of Honor for "Exemplifying outstanding qualities in both one's personal and professional lives while continuing to preserve the richness of one's particular heritage."
In 2021, he was bestowed Fellowship to the Royal College of Physicians (London).

Publications

Books
1990 Gastroenterology: Problems in Primary Care (Problems in Primary Care Series)
2001 The Liver Book: A Comprehensive Guide to Diagnosis, Treatment, and Recovery
2010 Doctor Chopra Says: Medical Facts and Myths Everyone Should Know
2012 Live Better, Live Longer. The New Studies That Reveal What’s Really Good and Bad for Your Health (paperback version of above book)
2012 Leadership by Example: The Ten Key Principles of All Great Leaders
2013 Brotherhood: Dharma, Destiny, and the American Dream (co-authored with Deepak Chopra)
2016 The Big Five: Five Simple Things You Can Do to Live a Longer, Healthier Life
2017 Two Most Important Days: How to Find Your Purpose and Live a Happier and Healthier Life (co-authored with Gina Vild)

Selected published works

Sidhu S, Flamm S, Chopra S. Pneumatosis cystoides intestinalis: an incidental finding in a patient with AIDS and cryptosporidial diarrhea. Am J Gastroenterol. 1994 Sep; 89(9):1578-9.
Proctor DD, Chopra S, Rubenstein SC, Jokela JA, Uhl L. Mycobacteremia and granulomatous hepatitis following initial intravesical bacillus Calmette-Guerin instillation for bladder carcinoma. Am J Gastroenterol. 1993 Jul; 88(7):1112-5.
Nompleggi DJ, Farraye FA, Singer A, Edelman RR, Chopra S. Hepatic schistosomiasis: report of two cases and literature review. Am J Gastroenterol. 1991 Nov; 86(11):1658-64.
Rustgi AK, Chopra S. Chest pain of esophageal origin. J Gen Intern Med. 1989 Mar-Apr; 4(2):151-9.
Blumberg RS, Chopra S, Ibrahim R, Crawford J, Farraye FA, Zeldis JB, Berman MD. Primary hepatocellular carcinoma in idiopathic hemochromatosis after reversal of cirrhosis. Gastroenterology. 1988 Nov; 95(5):1399-402.
Weinman MD, Chopra S. Tumors of the liver, other than primary hepatocellular carcinoma. Gastroenterol Clin North Am. 1987 Dec; 16(4):627-50.
Griffin PH, Schnure FW, Chopra S, Brooks DC, Gilliam JI. Intramural gastrointestinal hemorrhage. J Clin Gastroenterol. 1986 Jun; 8(3 Pt 2):389-94.
Roberts I, Chopra S, Warshaw AL. Carcinoma of the lung with marked hyperamylasemia and elevated serum calcitonin. Am J Gastroenterol. 1982 Jan; 77(1):43-4.

References

1949 births
Living people
All India Institute of Medical Sciences, New Delhi alumni
American medical academics
American people of Indian descent in health professions
Harvard Medical School faculty
Indian emigrants to the United States
Indian expatriates in the United States
Medical doctors from Maharashtra
Scientists from Pune
Delhi University alumni